East Rudham is a village and civil parish in the English county of Norfolk.

History
East Rudham's name is of Anglo-Saxon origin and derives from the Old English for 'Rudda's' homestead or village.

Several Iron Age and Roman artefacts have been found close to East Rudham, and there is further evidence to suggest a small Roman settlement was based on the modern village.

In the Domesday Book, East and West Rudham are recorded together as a settlement of 67 households in the hundred of Brothercross. In 1086, the village was divided between the East Anglian estates of Alan of Brittany, William de Warenne and Peter de Valognes.

During the Second World War, a starfish site was created on nearby Coxford Heath designed to draw Luftwaffe bombers away from King's Lynn.

In 2016, several test pits were dug by the University of Cambridge around the parish.

Geography
According to the 2011 Census, East Rudham, including Broomsthorpe, has a population of 541 residents living in 281 households.

East Rudham falls within the constituency of North West Norfolk and is represented at Parliament by James Wild MP of the Conservative Party. For the purposes of local government, the parish falls within the district of King's Lynn and West Norfolk.

St. Mary's Church
East Rudham's church is dedicated to Saint Mary and was rebuilt in the mid-Nineteenth Century in the Perpendicular style after the tower collapsed into the Nave. St. Mary's font pre-dates the church and is dated 1852.

Transport
East Rudham railway station opened in 1880 as a stop on the Midland and Great Northern Joint Railway between South Lynn and Melton Constable. The station closed in 1959.

The A148, between King's Lynn and Cromer, bisects the village.

War Memorial
East and West Rudham's war memorial takes the form of an obelisk topped with a wheel cross, located beside the A148. It lists the following names from East Rudham for the First World War:
 Corporal H. Walter Wake (1888-1915), 5th Battalion, Royal Norfolk Regiment
 Lance-Corporal Bertie R. Huggins (1895-1917), 9th Battalion, Royal Norfolk Regiment
 Driver Claude Whitby (1898-1918), 20th (Ammunition Column) Brigade, Royal Horse Artillery
 Gunner Alfred Vertigen (1898-1918), 331st Brigade, Royal Field Artillery
 Gunner William E. Hammond (1888-1917), 64th (Siege) Battery, Royal Garrison Artillery
 Gunner Frank Green (1885-1918), 290th (Siege) Battery, Royal Garrison Artillery
 Private Herbert Gregory (1889-1917), 13th Battalion, Royal Fusiliers
 Private Robert W. Nicholls (1890-1918), 7th Battalion, Leicestershire Regiment
 Private Albert E. Overland (1886-1917), 205th Company, Machine Gun Corps
 Private James E. Daniels (1895-1916), 1st Battalion, Royal Norfolk Regiment
 Private Cecil E. Strangleman (1895-1917), 5th Battalion, Royal Norfolk Regiment
 Private Ernest A. Bobbitt (1880-1918), 1st Battalion, Northamptonshire Regiment
 Private Albert L. Dawson (1894-1917), 1st Battalion, Northamptonshire Regiment
 Private Edric J. Couzens (1893-1916), 1st Battalion, Worcestershire Regiment

And, the following for the Second World War:
 Lieutenant Henry R. Newton (1917-1944), Royal Norfolk Regiment
 Corporal Charles H. Riches (1917-1940), 1st Battalion, Coldstream Guards
 Lance-Corporal Gordon L. Norman (1924-1943), 5th Battalion, Royal Norfolk Regiment
 Leading-Aircraftman Norman F. Kirk (d.1942), Royal Air Force
 Gunner George W. Twite (1907-1941), 1st (Light) Anti-Aircraft Regiment, Royal Artillery
 Private Cecil E. Strangleman (1926-1944), 2nd Battalion, Essex Regiment
 Private D. G. Thomas Woodard (1912-1944), 2nd Battalion, Royal Norfolk Regiment
 Reverend Henry T. Wagg (1909-1944), Royal Army Chaplains' Department att. 11th Armoured Division

References

External links

Villages in Norfolk
King's Lynn and West Norfolk
Civil parishes in Norfolk